was a railway station located in Wajima, Ishikawa Prefecture, Japan, first opened in 1935. The station was closed in 2001 when the Nanao line between Anamizu and Wajima was abandoned.

Line
 Noto Railway
 Nanao Line

Adjacent stations

External links 
 Wajima Station page at notor.info

Railway stations in Ishikawa Prefecture
Defunct railway stations in Japan
Railway stations closed in 2001